Sergio Narváez Barrera (born 11 July 1985) is a Spanish footballer who plays for Xerez Deportivo FC as a winger.

Football career
Born in Jerez de la Frontera, Andalusia, Narváez was a product of hometown Xerez CD's youth system, and made senior debuts with the reserves in the 2004–05 season, competing several years with the side in the lower leagues. On 28 May 2005 he made his professional debut, coming on as a second-half substitute in a 1–1 away draw against Real Murcia.

In August 2006, Narváez and his brother were loaned to AD Ceuta, in Segunda División B. In July of the following year he rescinded with the Andalusians and moved to Racing Club Portuense, in the same level.

After failing to appear in the half of the 2008–09 campaign, Narváez moved to Tercera División's Jerez Industrial CF in January 2009. He continued to appear in the third and fourth divisions in the following seasons, representing Lorca Deportiva CF, CF Villanovense, CD Don Benito and Marbella FC, achieving a promotion in the end of 2013–14 with the latter.

Personal life
Narváez's twin brother and cousin, David and Kiko, respectively, are both footballers; the former played alongside him in Xerez, and the latter spent most of his career with Atlético Madrid.

References

External links

1985 births
Living people
Footballers from Jerez de la Frontera
Spanish footballers
Association football wingers
Segunda División players
Segunda División B players
Tercera División players
Xerez CD B players
Xerez CD footballers
AD Ceuta footballers
Jerez Industrial CF players
Lorca Deportiva CF footballers
CF Villanovense players
Marbella FC players
Xerez Deportivo FC footballers